Eumetabola is an unranked clade of Neoptera. Two large unities known as the Eumetabola and Paurometabola are probably from the adelphotaxa of the Neoptera after exclusion of the Plecoptera. The monophyly of these unities appears to be weakly justified.

Eumetabola has the highest number of species of any clade. According to a phylogenetic analysis, the Eumetabola clade originated 390-350 million years ago, in the Late Devonian.

Phylogeny
The phylogeny of Eumetabola is shown in the cladogram according to Kluge 2004, 2010, and 2012:

References

External links 
 Eumetabola Hennig 1953 insecta.bio.spbu.ru
 Grimaldi, D.; Engel, M. S. 2005: Evolution of the insects. Cambridge University Press, New York. limited preview on Google books
 "The Earliest known Holometabolous insects" 

 
Insect taxonomy
Neoptera